Passeport diplomatique agent K 8/Operation Diplomatic Passport is a 1965 French and Italian spy film thriller directed by Robert Vernay.  It was based on the 1959 novel by Maurice Dekobra.

Cast
Roger Hanin as Mirmont
Christiane Minazzoli as Eva Dolbry
Lucien Nat as Professeur Wilkowski
René Dary as Chef de la D.S.T.
Antonio Passalia as Serge Alerio (as Anthony Pass)
René Blancard as Raddel
Yves Barsacq as Le laborantin
Donald O'Brien as Dolbry
Madeleine Lambert as La tante
Laurence Aubray
Denise Bataille
Henri Coutet
Robert Favart
Lucien Frégis
Clément Harari
Claude Jenner
Antoine Marin
Charles Millot
Jacqueline Rivière
Michel Salina

External links
 

1965 films
1960s spy thriller films
Italian spy thriller films
French spy thriller films
1960s French-language films
Films based on French novels
1960s French films
1960s Italian films
French-language Italian films